Caviodon is an extinct genus of Late Miocene to Late Pliocene (Chapadmalalan to Montehermosan in the SALMA classification) rodents, related to the modern capybara. Fossils of Caviodon have been found in Argentina, Venezuela, and Brazil.

Known species include:

References 

Cavies
Miocene rodents
Pliocene rodents
Miocene mammals of South America
Pliocene mammals of South America
Montehermosan
Chapadmalalan
Neogene Argentina
Fossils of Argentina
Ituzaingó Formation
Neogene Venezuela
Fossils of Venezuela
Fossil taxa described in 1885
Taxa named by Florentino Ameghino